Laurence Marcellus Larson (September 23, 1868 – March 9, 1938) was a Norwegian born, American educator, historian, writer and translator. His notable works included his translation from Old Norse of Konungs skuggsjá.

Biography
Laurence Larson was born at Bergen in Hordaland, Norway. He was the son of Christian Spjutoy Larson (1840–1919)  and Ellen Mathilde (Bruland) Larson (1839–1916). He emigrated to the United States with his family in May 1870. He studied at Drake University and the University of Wisconsin–Madison. Larson was appointed to the UW faculty as a Scandinavian languages and history professor on April 17, 1906, but resigned later that year, on June 27. He joined the University of Illinois at Urbana-Champaign in 1907 and became history department chair in 1923. Larson continued teaching at UIUC until his September 1937 retirement.

Larson was named a trustee of the Illinois State Historical Library in 1923. He was elected to the presidency of the American Historical Association in 1938, but died of acute bronchitis in Urbana, Illinois, aged 69, before completing his term.

Selected works

The Federal Compact of 1787 (1900)
The King's Household in England Before the Norman Conquest (1904)
A Financial and Administrative History of Milwaukee (1908)
Canute the Great the Rise of Danish Imperialism during the Viking Age (1912)
A Short History of England and the British Empire (1915)
The King’s Mirror  (1917)
The Responsibility for the Great War (1918)
The Earliest Norwegian Laws: Being the Gulathing Law and the Frostathing Law (1935)
The Changing West: And Other Essays (1937)
The Log Book of a Young Immigrant  (1939)

References

Other sources
Larson, Laurence Marcellus (1939) The Log Book of a Young Immigrant (Norwegian-American Historical Association)
Laurence M. Larson Papers, 1876–1938 | University of Illinois Archives

External links

The King's Mirror (Speculum regale-Konungs skuggsjá) translated from Old Norse by Laurence Marcellus Larson

1868 births
1938 deaths
Norwegian emigrants to the United States
Translators to English
Norwegian–English translators
American historians
Drake University alumni
University of Wisconsin–Madison alumni
University of Wisconsin–Madison faculty
University of Illinois Urbana-Champaign faculty
Infectious disease deaths in Illinois
Deaths from bronchitis
Presidents of the American Historical Association